Lobawn at , is the 182nd–highest peak in Ireland on the Arderin scale, and the 219th–highest peak on the Vandeleur-Lynam scale.  Lobawn has a flat boggy summit plateau with a "war department" concrete post to mark the top.  Lobawn lies in the west section of the Wicklow Mountains, in Wicklow, Ireland, and has a subsidiary summit called Sugarloaf (West Wicklow) .  Both Lobawn and the Sugarloaf border the Glen of Imaal, and their summits lie close to the actual boundaries of the Glen of Imaal Military Artillery Firing Range.

Bibliography

See also

Wicklow Way
Wicklow Mountains
Lists of mountains in Ireland
List of mountains of the British Isles by height
List of Hewitt mountains in England, Wales and Ireland

References

External links
MountainViews: The Irish Mountain Website, Lobawn
MountainViews: Irish Online Mountain Database
The Database of British and Irish Hills , the largest database of British Isles mountains ("DoBIH")
Hill Bagging UK & Ireland, the searchable interface for the DoBIH

Mountains and hills of County Wicklow
Geography of County Wicklow
Hewitts of Ireland